Major General William Havelock Chaplin Ramsden,  (3 October 1888 – 16 December 1969) was a senior British Army officer, who is most notable for commanding the 50th (Northumbrian) Infantry Division during the Second World War.

Early life and First World War
Born in Chester, Cheshire, England, on 3 October 1888, the son of Reverend Henry Plumptre Ramsden and Ethel Frances Alice Havelock, William Ramsden was educated at Bath College and the Royal Military College, Sandhurst, where he was commissioned as a second lieutenant into the West India Regiment on 5 October 1910. Promoted to lieutenant on 2 October 1912, Ramsden served in the First World War with the 2nd Battalion of his regiment, initially in the Cameroons and in Nigeria with his regiment and then, from 19 March 1916, as a captain in the East Yorkshire Regiment. He served with the regiment on the Western Front, in France and Belgium, where he was awarded the Military Cross (MC) while attached to the 35th Battalion of the Machine Gun Corps (MGC), and was promoted to the temporary rank of major on 16 February 1918. On 22 January 1918 he married Christine Adelaide Baldwin, daughter of James Yescombe Baldwin.

Between the wars
Between the wars Ramsden remained in the British Army, reaching the rank of lieutenant colonel by 1933, and securing command of the 1st Battalion, Hampshire Regiment in 1936. He was on active service on operations in Waziristan and Palestine during this period and was mentioned in despatches. He went on to be Commander of the West Lancashire Area in 1939.

Second World War
Ramsden fought in the Second World War, commanding the 25th Infantry Brigade during the fighting in France in May 1940 as part of the British Expeditionary Force (BEF). Mentioned in despatches for his services, on 12 December 1940 he was promoted to the acting rank of major general and was appointed General Officer Commanding (GOC) of the 50th (Northumbrian) Infantry Division in succession to Giffard Martel. The division, which left England in mid-1941, fought well in North Africa the following year. He was promoted to command XXX Corps in July 1942, which post he held until September 1942. Returning to England, he was given Bernard Montgomery's old command, the 3rd Infantry Division, in December 1942, holding this post until December 1943 when succeeded by Tom Rennie. From early 1944 he was dispatched to the Sudan and became Commandant, Sudan Defence Force, later commanding British Troops in Sudan and Eritrea. He retired from the army in 1945.

References

Bibliography

External links

Generals of World War II

|-

|-

|-

1888 births
1969 deaths
British Army generals of World War II
British Army personnel of World War I
British military personnel of the 1936–1939 Arab revolt in Palestine
Companions of the Distinguished Service Order
Companions of the Order of the Bath
Commanders of the Order of the British Empire
East Yorkshire Regiment officers
Graduates of the Royal Military College, Sandhurst
People educated at Bath College (English public school)
People from Chester
British Army major generals
West India Regiment officers
Recipients of the Military Cross
Royal Hampshire Regiment officers
Sudan Defence Force officers
Military personnel from Chester